Junichiro Ishikawa (1897 – 1987) was a Japanese architect. His work was part of the architecture event in the art competition at the 1936 Summer Olympics.

References

1897 births
1987 deaths
20th-century Japanese architects
Olympic competitors in art competitions
People from Yokohama